Chroma Squad is a tactical role-playing video game developed by the Brazilian development team at Behold Studios. The game is influenced by tokusatsu TV shows, particularly the Super Sentai and Power Rangers franchises. The game's development was funded via Kickstarter.

The game was released on April 30, 2015 for Microsoft Windows, Mac OS X and Linux. Digital distribution is available through Steam and GOG.com. Chroma Squad was released in early 2017 for PlayStation 4, Xbox One, iOS and Android  mobile devices, being published by Bandai Namco Entertainment. A PlayStation Vita version was planned, however was ultimately cancelled. It was announced to be released on May 19, 2017 on PSN for PlayStation 4. It was also released for Nintendo Switch on Aug 1, 2019.

Plot
The game follows a team of stunt actors that tired of their previous job, decide to start their own Tokusatsu company, assisted by a mysterious artifact they find known as "Cerebro".

Gameplay
Once the studio is established, the player must assign the actors, each with their own special traits, to their respective roles in the team and their suits' colors. Other features can be changed as the game progresses including the team's name, the name of their robot and their catchphrases. Each stage in the game is a different episode of the show in which the heroes fight a group of villains, sometimes followed by a battle between the team's giant mecha and an enlarged monster, and their performance during the episode take a direct impact on the show's ratings. High ratings increase the show's fanbase and revenue, which can be used to improve the studio and upgrade the team's equipment and mecha. The episodes are grouped into seasons and failure to complete the goals set by the sponsors at the end of each season will lead to a game over.

The battles follow the heroes fighting initially in their normal selves, but later gaining the ability to transform, recovering their HP and obtaining special abilities. The "teamwork" function allows heroes to help each other during battle, be it reaching longer distances, dealing powerful attacks together, or combining their powers into a special attack that increases ratings when used to destroy the monster of the week.

Reception

Chroma Squad received mixed to positive reviews from critics upon release. On Metacritic, the game holds scores of 75/100 for the PC version (based on 21 reviews), and 74/100 for the PlayStation 4 version (based on 7 reviews).

Rights dispute
The rights were disputed by Saban Brands, owner of the Power Rangers franchise brand. An agreement was reached where Saban was given a royalty share of the project. The game's official logo has an additional subtitle that reads "Inspired by Saban's Power Rangers™".

See also 

 Out of Space

References

External links 
 

2015 video games
Android (operating system) games
Cancelled PlayStation 3 games
Cancelled PlayStation Vita games
Crowdfunded video games
IOS games
Kickstarter-funded video games
Linux games
MacOS games
Indie video games
Nintendo Switch games
PlayStation 4 games
PlayStation Network games
Power Rangers video games
Single-player video games
Tokusatsu video games
Video games developed in Brazil
Windows games
Xbox One games